This is a list of Croatian television related events from 1995.

Events
12 March - Magazin & Lidija Horvat-Dunjko are selected to represent Croatia at the 1995 Eurovision Song Contest with their song "Nostalgija". They are selected to be the third Croatian Eurovision entry during Dora held at the Crystal Ballroom of Hotel Kvarner in Opatija.

Debuts
Večernja škola

Television shows

Ending this year

Births

Deaths